Zion Baptist Church may refer to:

in the United States
(by state)
 Zion Baptist Church (Marietta, Georgia), listed on the NRHP in Georgia
 Zion Baptist Church (Collinsville, Mississippi), listed on the NRHP in Mississippi
 Zion Baptist Church (Omaha, Nebraska)

See also
Mount Zion Baptist Church (disambiguation)